Jack Taylor (born 9 May 1924) is a former Australian rules footballer who played with Hawthorn in the Victorian Football League (VFL).

Notes

External links 

1924 births
Living people
Australian rules footballers from Victoria (Australia)
Hawthorn Football Club players
People educated at Melbourne High School